Paraschoenionta is a monotypic beetle genus in the family Cerambycidae described by Stephan von Breuning in 1950. Its only species, Paraschoenionta shelfordi, was described by Per Olof Christopher Aurivillius in 1923.

References

Saperdini
Beetles described in 1923
Monotypic beetle genera